Otic means pertaining to the ear. It can refer to:
 Otic ganglion, nerve cells in ear
 Otic polyp, benign growth in middle ear
 Otic capsule, another name for bony labyrinth
 Otic drops, another name for ear drops
 Otic notch, notch in skull of some species
 Otic pit, developmental stage of ear
 Otic placode, developmental stage of ear
 Otic vesicle, developmental stage of ear

Others
 Ohio Turnpike and Infrastructure Commission, the body overseeing the Ohio Turnpike
 Otic Records, record label founded by Bobby Naughton